Holambra (from the words Holland-America-Brazil) is a municipality in the state of São Paulo in Brazil. It is part of the Metropolitan Region of Campinas. Holambra is the largest producer of flowers and ornamental plants in Latin America, also hosting the largest spring event in the continent, the Expoflora. The population is 15,272 (2020 est.) in an area of 65.58 km2. The elevation is 600m on average.

History 

The colony Holambra and The Cooperativa Agropecuária de Holambra (Cattle Farming Cooperation of Holambra) were founded in 1948 by Catholic Dutch immigrants at the farm Fazenda Ribeirão, situated between the cities Jaguariúna, Santo Antonio de Posse, Artur Nogueira and Cosmópolis.

After the devastation caused by World War II, the Dutch government stimulated emigration to Australia, Brazil, Canada and France. Brazil was the only nation to allow the arrival of large groups of Catholics. With the consent of the Brazilian government, the Catholic Dutch Farmers and Market-gardeners Union (Dutch: Katholieke Nederlandse Boeren- en Tuindersbond) coordinated the emigration process.

A group of approximately 500 migrants from the province of North Brabant arrived in Brazil, establishing their first colony at the farm of Fazenda Ribeirão in the state of São Paulo. Holambra I was founded on July 14, 1948.

After a referendum in 1991 where 98% of the population voted in favor of political autonomy for the area, Holambra gained city status in January 1993.

Famous for its large production of flowers and plants and for the yearly event Expoflora, Holambra receives thousands of tourists each year. In April 1998 this fact was recognized as Holambra gained the status of Estância Turística, touristic location.

See also
 Castrolanda

References

External links 
  Prefeitura Municipal de Holambra  Official municipal website
  Holambra SP em WebGIS A zoomable map of Holambra at EMBRAPA

Brazilian people of Dutch descent
Municipalities in São Paulo (state)
Populated places established in 1993